Squash at the 2010 Asian Games was held in Asian Games Town Gymnasium, Guangzhou, China from 18 November 2010 to 25 November 2010.

Malaysia topped the medal table by winning three out of four possible gold medals.

Schedule

Medalists

Medal table

Participating nations
A total of 69 athletes from 13 nations competed in squash at the 2010 Asian Games:

References
Asian Squash Federation

External links
Official website

 
2010
2010 Asian Games events
A